A number of motor vessels were named Escaut, including:

, a Dutch coaster in service 1929–41
, a Belgian cargo ship in service 1938–41

Ship names